Joseph Martin Neville MBE (born 6 January 1944) is a British former sports shooter.

Shooting career
Neville competed at the 1972 Summer Olympics and the 1976 Summer Olympics. He represented England and won a silver medal in the skeet event, at the 1974 British Commonwealth Games in Christchurch, New Zealand. Four years later he represented England and won a bronze medal in the skeet, at the 1978 Commonwealth Games in Edmonton, Alberta, Canada. A third Commonwealth Games appearance for England resulted in the 1986 Commonwealth Games in Edinburgh, Scotland and it was his most successful because he won a gold medal in the skeet pair with Ken Harman and a bronze medal in the individual skeet.

References

1944 births
Living people
British male sport shooters
Olympic shooters of Great Britain
Shooters at the 1972 Summer Olympics
Shooters at the 1976 Summer Olympics
People from Bakewell
Sportspeople from Derbyshire
Shooters at the 1974 British Commonwealth Games
Shooters at the 1978 Commonwealth Games
Shooters at the 1986 Commonwealth Games
Commonwealth Games medallists in shooting
Commonwealth Games gold medallists for England
Commonwealth Games silver medallists for England
Commonwealth Games bronze medallists for England
20th-century British people
Medallists at the 1974 British Commonwealth Games
Medallists at the 1978 Commonwealth Games
Medallists at the 1986 Commonwealth Games